Minaxorlu (also, Minəxorlu and Minakhorlu) is a village and municipality in the Aghjabadi District of Azerbaijan. The population of the village is 1,920.

References 

Populated places in Aghjabadi District